Andris Ambainis (born 18 January 1975) is a Latvian computer scientist active in the fields of quantum information theory and quantum computing.

Education and career
Ambainis has held past positions at the Institute for Advanced Study at Princeton, New Jersey and the Institute for Quantum Computing at the University of Waterloo. He is currently a professor in the Faculty of Computing at the University of Latvia.

He received a Bachelors (1996), Masters (1997), and Doctorate (1997) in Computer Science from the University of Latvia, as well as a PhD (2001) from the University of California, Berkeley.

Contributions
Ambainis has contributed extensively to quantum information processing and foundations of quantum mechanics, mostly through his work on quantum walks and lower bounds for quantum query complexity.

Recognition
In 1991 he received a perfect score and gold medal at the International Mathematical Olympiad. He won an Alfred P. Sloan Fellowship in 2008. Ambainis was an invited speaker at the 2018 International Congress of Mathematicians, speaking on mathematical aspects of computer science.

References

External links
Andris Ambainis homepage
(in Latvian)
(in Latvian)

Living people
1975 births
Theoretical computer scientists
Institute for Advanced Study visiting scholars
Scientists from Daugavpils
University of California, Berkeley alumni
University of Latvia alumni
Academic staff of the University of Latvia
International Mathematical Olympiad participants